The Greater Metro Junior A Hockey League (GMHL) is a Canadian developmental junior ice hockey league. The league has primarily had teams in the Greater Toronto Area, Central Ontario, Northeastern Ontario, and Quebec. In 2019, they added three teams from Alberta.

As of December 2019, the league's alumni page lists 889 players from 2006 to 2019 who graduated from the GMHL to play for NCAA colleges, various professional leagues, major junior teams, or represented their country in various IIHF World Championships.

The GMHL is an independent junior league and is not a member of the Canadian Junior Hockey League or sanctioned by Hockey Canada.

History
The league, founded by Bob Russell and Hockeyworks International Ltd., opened its doors in early 2006, with a unique concept and approach to improving the standard of developing young hockey players within a Junior 'A' league format setting.
A draft showcase event took place from May 5 until May 7, 2006 with players from Canada, United States, and Europe taking up residence at the Hockeyworks' World Hockey Centre near Shelburne, Ontario to take part in the league's first tryout camp.

 As of September 2006, it became clear that the league would operate its first season with seven teams. The original seven were the Bradford Rattlers, Deseronto Thunder, King Wild, Nipissing Alouettes, Richmond Hill Rams, South Muskoka Shield, and Toronto Canada Moose.

The league's first ever game took place on September 8, 2006 between the King Wild and the Richmond Hill Rams. The final result was a 6–0 victory for the Rams, despite being badly outshot by the Wild. The first goal in the league's history was scored by the Rams' Darren Archibald (future Vancouver Canucks prospect) on the power play during the first period. Rams' goaltender Daniel Jones picked up the historical first victory, as well as the league's first shutout in history.

On November 15, 2006, the GMJHL announced its affiliation with the World Hockey Association and creation of the National Junior Hockey Alliance. The affiliation resulted in a national championship between the GMJHL playoff champion and the winner of the WHA Junior West Hockey League after the 2006–07 season.

The first ever regular season of the GMJHL concluded on February 25, 2007 with the Bradford Rattlers leading the way as regular season champs with a record of 37 wins, 1 regulation loss, and 4 overtime losses. In the playoffs, the Rattlers beat the Deseronto Thunder in six games, and then the King Wild in five games to win the first ever Russell Cup as playoff champions.

In September 2007, the GMJHL started its second season with six new teams, the Douro Dukes, Elliot Lake Bobcats, Espanola Kings, Innisfil Lakers, Tamworth Cyclones, and Temiscaming Royals. The Deseronto Thunder ran into financial trouble after their first season and ownership of the team was transferred to the town. The team is now known as the Deseronto Storm.

On December 11, 2007, the GMJHL announced a seven-game challenge series versus a Russian team known as the Moscow Selects. In late December and early January, the top seven teams of the GMJHL will compete against the Moscow Selects—a mixture of top Top Junior talent from the City of Moscow. The Selects played seven games, against Bradford, Innisfil, Temiscaming, Elliot Lake, Richmond Hill, Deseronto, and South Muskoka, winning each game. In March 2008, the King Wild and Richmond Hill Rams played two games each against the Mexico national ice hockey team. The Wild won both their games, while the Rams lost both of theirs.

For the 2008–09 season, the GMJHL adopted much of the National Collegiate Athletic Association's ice hockey rulebook. The GMJHL added the Minden Riverkings and the Oro-Medonte 77's to the mix, and the Dukes relocated to become the Brock Bucks. At the same time, the Quebec-based Temiscaming Royals walked away from the league to join the Northern Ontario Junior Hockey League, but were replaced within weeks by the Ville-Marie Dragons.

In December 2008 and January 2009, eight teams of the GMHL hosted Kazakhstan's Under-18 Torpedo UST-Kamenogorsk squad. Victorious were the Elliot Lake Bobcats (twice), South Muskoka Shield, King Wild, Bradford Rattlers, Innisfil Lakers, and a Nipissing/Ville-Marie combined squad. The only loss for a GMHL team happened to the Toronto Canada Moose.

In the summer of 2010, the GMHL expanded in two fashions internationally. First, Canada's only All-Russian team in the Shelburne Red Wings and then late in the summer they expanded to the United States through the expansion of the Jamestown Jets.

On September 17, 2010, the GMHL played its first international regulation game, in Jamestown, New York between the Jamestown Jets and Sturgeon Falls Lumberjacks, both expansion teams to the league for the 2010–11 season. Jamestown won the game 4–3. In December 2010, the GMHL named Bob Bernstein commissioner. After serving as commissioner for seven days, Bernstein was relieved of his duties and Ken Girard later resumed as full-time commissioner.

In mid-January 2011, it was announced that the town of Iron Bridge, Ontario and its 500-seat outdoor arena would host a regular season game, known as the North Shore Winter Classic, between the Elliot Lake Bobcats and Algoma Avalanche on January 29, 2011. This is the first known regulation outdoor game in Ontario in the modern era. Elliot Lake would win the game 8–2 in front of an estimated 400 fans.

At the conclusion of the 2011–12 season, the league lost the Elliot Lake Bobcats to the Northern Ontario Junior Hockey League. Relocation of teams and expansion was busier than ever in 2014. The Mattawa Voyageurs moved to Sundridge to make way for an NOJHL team. The Powassan Eagles moved to Parry Sound to make way for an NOJHL team. The league expanded rapidly with a total of 15 new teams in the off-season of 2014 and 2015. There was a total of 30 teams, with a total of six teams playing in the same market (two teams per town).

The Shelburne Red Wings were sold after the 2013–14 season, and were renamed the Shelburne Stars. However, the Stars did not play in 2014–15 and changed their name to the Shelburne Sharks and began play in 2015–16. In May 2015, the Rama Aces took a leave of absence but never returned. In November 2015, the Brantford Steelfighters suspended their operations after 18 games.

The Shelburne Sharks returned as the Shelburne Stars in June 2016, but the team folded soon afterwards. The Sturgeon Falls Lumberjacks re-branded as the West Nipissing Lynx, but remained in Sturgeon Falls. Early into the 2016–17 season, the Toronto Blue Ice Jets were removed from the schedule in the first week, the Bracebridge Blues in the fifth week, the Komoka Dragons in the seventh week, the Lincoln Mavericks in the twelfth week, and Wiarton Rock in the fifteenth week of the season. The Orangeville Ice Crushers would also suspend operations in January 2017 and all remaining games against Orangeville were considered forfeits.

For 2017–18, the league added the Fergus Force, Ville-Marie Pirates, Wiarton Schooners, and Windsor Aces while losing the Toronto Attack. In late August 2017, the Parry Sound Islanders announced they were taking a leave of absence and merged with the Seguin Huskies. The Force and Schooners both folded during the season without winning a game.

After one season following the Islanders merge, the Seguin Huskies folded in 2018. The GMHL also added two teams originally in the Canadian Premier Junior Hockey League in the Niagara-on-the-Lake Nationals and Ottawa Sharpshooters for 2018–19. The Wiarton Schooners returned but folded midseason for the second consecutive season, and third consecutive midseason GMHL team folding in the town of Wiarton.

In 2019, the league added the Western Provinces Hockey Association (WPHA) as a Western Division in the GMHL for the 2019–20 season, which then rebranded as the GMHL West. The WPHA had played the previous season in the Western States Hockey League as the Provinces Division. The 2020 playoffs were then curtailed by the onset of the COVID-19 pandemic and no champion was named. The following 2020–21 season did not take place as scheduled due to pandemic restrictions in Ontario and Quebec, with six teams playing only two games each in December 2020. The four teams in the GMHL West were able to play a partial season and a playoff in May 2021.

Teams

2022–23 teams

2022–23 changes
The Plattsville Lakers were suspended following league investigation.
 Early February Kitimat Saax announced that they intended to enter a team in the West Division.
 Article in Interior news noted the Burns Lake Timbermen and Tumbler Ridge Steel Kings, will join Kitimat in expansion.

Regular season champions
Bolded are overall regular season champions.

Russell Cup playoff champions
Bolded are overall champions, Italics are finalist.

College Showcase Tournament
Since 2009, the GMHL has had a mid-season prospect tournament. Generally, the top seven teams of the league compete in the tournament with an eighth team, the GMHL Selects representing the other teams in the league.

The 2012 tournament featured both the Bradford Rattlers and South Muskoka Shield being thrown out in the semifinal round. An incident, both on-ice and later off-ice, involving a player from each team and later two more players and a parent from one team entering the altercation, resulted in a police investigation and one team refusing to continue. The league disqualified both teams after the game failed to continue.

Since the 2012 tournament, the league changed the format to a prospect weekend with no championship rounds.

League records

Scoring champions

Goals against average champions

Team records 
Best record: 2012–13 Bradford Rattlers (42–0–0–0)
Worst record: 2007–08 Douro Dukes (2–40–0–0)
Most goals for by team, one season: 2017–18 St. George Ravens (404)
Fewest goals for by team, one season: 2013–14 Toronto Predators (91)
Fewest goals against by team, one season: 2015–16 Kingsville Kings (71)
Most goals against by team, one season: 2015–16 Bobcaygeon Storm (491)
Largest margin of victory: Elliot Lake Bobcats 29, Ville-Marie Dragons 1 on December 6, 2008

Individual records 
Most goals, one season: Bryce Yetman (81) — 2018–19 Windsor Aces
Most assists, one season: Chris Haigh (89) — 2017–18 St. George Ravens
Most points, one season: Bryce Yetman (153) — 2018–19 Windsor Aces
Lowest goals against average, one season: Wes Werner (1.20) — 2015–16 Kingsville Kings
Highest save percentage, one season: Jan Pechek (0.951) — 2015–16 Kingsville Kings

Former teams

Timeline of teams
2006–07
League is formed with seven teams: Bradford Rattlers, Deseronto Thunder, King Wild, Nipissing Alouettes, Richmond Hill Rams, South Muskoka Shield, Toronto Canada Moose
2007–08
Deseronto Thunder become Deseronto Storm
League expands by six teams: Douro Dukes, Elliot Lake Bobcats, Espanola Kings, Innisfil Lakers, Tamworth Cyclones, Temiscaming Royals
2008–09
Douro Dukes move and become Brock Bucks
Richmond Hill Rams become Ontario Lightning Rams
Oro-Medonte 77's join league
Ville-Marie Dragons join league
Minden Riverkings join league
Temiscaming Royals leave league for Northern Ontario Junior Hockey League
2009–10
Ville-Marie Dragons fold mid-season (January)
Tamworth Cyclones fold mid-season (January)
Ontario Lightning Rams leave league
Espanola Kings leave league
Nipissing Alouettes leave league
Algoma Avalanche join league
Ville-Marie Dragons move and become Powassan Dragons
Minden Riverkings fold mid-season (November)
2010–11
Shelburne Red Wings join league
Sturgeon Falls Lumberjacks join league
King Wild move and become Vaughan Wild
Brock Bucks move and become Bobcaygeon Bucks
Innisfil Lakers leave league
Jamestown Jets join league from Northern Junior Hockey League (league's first American team)
2011–12
Mattawa Voyageurs join league
Temiscaming Titans join league
Halton Huskies join league
Orangeville Americans join league
Vaughan Stars join league
Vaughan Wild move and become Lefroy Wave
Powassan Dragons change name to Powassan Eagles
Oro-Medonte 77's leave league
Jamestown Jets leave league
2012–13
Rama Aces join league
Powassan Eagles return
Bradford Bulls join league
Toronto Attack join league
Bracebridge Phantoms join league
Elliot Lake Bobcats leave league for Northern Ontario Junior Hockey League
Deseronto Storm leave league for Empire B Junior C Hockey League
Algoma Avalanche leave league
2013–14
Expansion granted to the Alliston Coyotes of Alliston, Ontario.
Expansion granted to the Seguin Huskies of Seguin, Ontario.
Expansion granted to the Toronto Predators of Toronto, Ontario.
Expansion granted to Halton Ravens of Burlington, Ontario.
Expansion granted to Knights of Meaford of Meaford, Ontario.
 Toronto Canada Moose renamed Toronto Blue Ice Jets.
2014–15
Expansion granted to the Cambridge Bears of Cambridge, Ontario.
Lefroy Wave relocate to Markdale, Ontario and become Grey Highlands Bravehearts.
Expansion granted to the Tottenham Steam of Tottenham, Ontario.
Bobcaygeon Bucks leave league for CIHL.
Mattawa Voyageurs relocate to South River, Ontario and become Almaguin Spartans.
Expansion granted to the North York Renegades of Toronto, Ontario.
Bracebridge Phantoms change name to Bracebridge Blues.
Expansion granted to Niagara Whalers of Port Colborne, Ontario.
Powassan Eagles relocate to Parry Sound, Ontario and become Parry Sound Islanders.
Shelburne Red Wings are sold; change name to Shelburne Stars and take season off to restructure.
2015–16
Expansion granted to Bobcaygeon Storm of Bobcaygeon, Ontario.
Expansion granted to Brantford Steelfighters of Brantford, Ontario.
Expansion granted to Colborne Chiefs of Colborne, Ontario.
Expansion granted to Coldwater Falcons of Coldwater, Ontario.
Expansion granted to Grey County Grizzlies of Feversham, Ontario.
Expansion granted to Haliburton Wolves of Haliburton, Ontario.
Expansion granted to Kingsville Kings of Kingsville, Ontario.
Expansion granted to Komoka Dragons of Komoka, Ontario.
Expansion granted to London Lakers of London, Ontario.
Expansion granted to Norfolk Vikings of Simcoe, Ontario.	
Expansion granted to Oshawa Riverkings of Oshawa, Ontario.
Orangeville Americans were renamed the Orangeville Ice Crushers.
Shelburne Stars were renamed the Shelburne Sharks.
Brantford Steelfighters take leave of absence after 18 games played; league revokes membership.
Grey County Grizzlies cease operations after 23 games played and only one win.
Sturgeon Falls Lumberjacks end season early due to lack of players.
2016–17
Grey Highlands Bravehearts relocate to Wiarton, Ontario. The newly named Wiarton Rock would then fold midway through their first season on 14 December.
Expansion granted to Tillsonburg Hurricanes.
Bobcaygeon Storm membership revoked
Coldwater Falcons membership revoked
Grey County Grizzlies membership revoked
Haliburton Wolves membership revoked
Brantford Steelfighters membership revoked.
Expansion granted to Lincoln Mavericks of Lincoln, Ontario, but withdrew from the league on November 21 during their first season.
Colbourne Chiefs rebranded as Northumberland Stars after ownership change.
Alliston Coyotes rebranded as New Tecumseth Civics after ownership change.
 Sturgeon Falls Lumberjacks return to league. Change of ownership and rebranded as the West Nipissing Lynx.
 Shelburne Sharks rebrand as Shelbourne Stars but fold prior to the beginning of the season.
Norfolk Vikings take 2016–17 hiatus
Toronto Blue Ice Jets fold just before start of season.
Bracebridge Blues removed from schedule after playing five games and forfeiting a sixth.
Komoka Dragons folded after 12 games.
 Orangeville Ice Crushers suspended operations in January. Three of the team's owners had been arrested for drug distribution in November 2016 and were suspended by the league. The league transferred control to another shareholder who ceased operations of the team after two months.
2017–18
Fergus Force granted membership as an expansion team. Folded after playing 16 games, all loses, with one credited win for a Wiarton forfeit.
Ville-Marie Pirates granted membership as an expansion team.
Wiarton Schooners granted membership as an expansion team. Folded after eight winless games and a 25–1 loss to the Knights of Meaford.
Toronto Attack removed from GMHL's list of teams on website.
Windsor Aces granted membership as an expansion franchise.
Parry Sound Islanders cease operations and merged with Seguin Huskies.
2018–19
 Niagara-on-the-Lake Nationals expansion team added from the Canadian Premier Junior Hockey League after the Nationals decided to not participate in the CPJHL.
 Ottawa Sharpshooters joined as expansion team for 2018–19 season from the Canadian Premier Junior Hockey League.
The Seguin Huskies folded prior to the 2018–19 season.
Wiarton Schooners returned to league after folding during the previous season. Folded again after 17 games played, and a 1–16 record, in 2018.
2019–20
Bancroft, Ontario, was granted an expansion franchise with the Bancroft Rockhounds.
Oshawa Riverkings sold and rebranded as Durham RoadRunners.
Niagara-on-the-Lake Nationals folded after one season.
Tillsonburg Hurricanes ceased operations
The Western Provinces Hockey Association (WPHA) joins from the Western States Hockey League (WSHL) and rebrands as the GMHL West. The new West Division added five teams from Alberta and Saskatchewan: the Cold Lake Wings, Hinton Wildcats, Northern Alberta Tomahawks, Rosetown Red Wings, and Slave Lake Icedogs. The Hinton Wildcats did not make the final schedule after a lease dispute with the city and the WSHL while the Cold Lake Wings suspended operations and were replaced by YEG Edmonton Academy on the schedule, which then used the Wings branding. The Rosetown team also postponed the start of their season and then never played, while the YEG Edmonton Academy began using their uniforms as the High Prairie Red Wings and settled on a home rink in November.
The Ottawa Sharpshooters folded in December 2019.
2020–21
The London Lakers moved to Plattsville, Ontario, as the Plattsville Lakers.
The Tottenham Steam rebranded as the Tottenham Thunder.
An expansion team called the Fox Creek Ice Kings in Fox Creek, Alberta, added to the West Division.
2021–22
The Toronto Predators relocated to Niagara-on-the-Lake as the Niagara-on-the-Lake Predators.

References

External links
Greater Metro Jr. "A" Hockey League official website

 
O Greater